Karl Fostvedt is an American Freeskier from Ketchum, Idaho. He is sponsored by Dakine, K2 Sports, Anon Optics (a sub-brand of Burton Snowboards), Lethal Descent, Full Tilt Boots.

He has been featured in movies by D.O.S. Media, 4bi9 Media, Toy Soldier Productions and Poor Boyz Productions. In September 2012 he won the IF3 International Freeski Film Festival (IF3) Rookie of the Year award for his segment in the Red Bull Media House and Poor Boyz Productions produced film WE: A Collection of Individuals.

During the 2009-2010 Winter Karl competed in the Dew Tour slopestyle competition. He competed as an invited athlete at War of Rails  winning the contest in 2014.

He is known for his urban and backcountry skiing abilities.

Awards
1st Place - 2021 Kings and Queens of Corbet's 
2nd Place - 2019 Kings and Queens of Corbet's 
1st Place - 2018 Kings and Queens of Corbet's 
Won - 2012 IF3 Rookie of the Year
Nominated - 2013 Powder Award - Best Manmade Air
Won - 2014 Under Armour War of Rails at Bear Mountain

Freeskiing movies
 "Return to Send'er", Matchstick Media Productions,
Collab, D.O.S. Media,
Set Your Sights, Toy Soldier Productions,
Act Natural, Toy Soldier Productions, 
WE: A Collection of Individuals, Red Bull Media House, in association with Poor Boyz Productions,
Keep Looking, 4bi9 Media,
Tracing Skylines, Red Bull Media House, in association with Poor Boyz Productions 
- Teton gravity research Make believe (2020)

References

American freeskiers
Living people
People from Ketchum, Idaho
Year of birth missing (living people)